Jay Rosenblatt may refer to:
 Jay S. Rosenblatt, professor of psychology
 Jay Rosenblatt (filmmaker), American experimental documentary filmmaker